Dutzow is an unincorporated community in southeastern Warren County, Missouri, United States. It is located on Route 94, approximately three miles north of Washington. Located near the Missouri River, it is one of the oldest German communities in the state.

History

The Berlin Society established a settlement at present-day Dutzow in the 1830s. For this reason, it is often considered a "Latin Settlement". A post office called Dutzow has been in operation since 1869. According to tradition, the community was named after Dutzow in northeast Germany, the ancestral home of one of the first settlers, Johann Wilhelm Bock.

Dutzow today
Located along the Katy Trail, Dutzow sees considerable tourism each year. It is also the home of Blumenhof Vineyard & Winery. Another tourism draw is the Saint Vincent de Paul Church, constructed in 1874.

References

Unincorporated communities in Warren County, Missouri
German-American history
German-American culture in Missouri
German communities in the United States
Unincorporated communities in Missouri